Mary Riggans (19 July 1935 – 2 December 2013) was  a Scottish actress and singer. She was best known for playing the role of Susie Sweet in the BAFTA award winning children’s show Balamory. and  Effie Macinnes in Take the High Road. She began her acting career in 1946, when she did a voiceover at the age of 11, and went on to star in television, radio and theatre productions.

Acting
Riggans was best known for her role as Effie Macinnes on the Scottish television soap opera, Take the High Road from the early 1980s until the last episode in 2003. She appeared as Susie Sweet in Balamory, a children's television programme (2002–05), and as Sadie in Still Game (2002–07).  She appeared in the pilot episode of Taggart, "Killer".

Riggans once famously cleared glasses from tables at chucking out time during her run at The King’s Theatre.

Credits
 Mrs. McKinley - Maggie 1981-1982
 Nell – Dear Frankie (2004)
 Effie Macinnes – Take the High Road (1983-2003)
 Sadie – Still Game (2002–07)
 Susie Sweet – Balamory (2002–05)
 Prim Lady  – Taggart (1990)
 Spider – I, Lovett (1989)
 Mrs. Ramsay – "Taggart" (Pilot episode "Killer" 1983)

Death
Riggans died in her sleep at her Edinburgh home on 2 December 2013, a year after suffering a stroke. BBC Scotland executive Yvonne Jennings, who worked as a producer on Balamory, paid tribute to the actress.

She said: "As Suzie Sweet in Balamory, Mary was well respected by those who worked with her and much loved by the CBeebies audience.  Like Suzie, Mary was a kind and giving woman who took on the role of nurturing young talent."

References

External links
 

1935 births
2013 deaths
20th-century Scottish actresses
21st-century Scottish actresses
People from Clydebank
Scottish film actresses
Scottish soap opera actresses
Scottish stage actresses
Scottish television actresses
Scottish voice actresses
Deaths from cerebrovascular disease